The Sala delle Asse (In English: 'room of the tower' or 'hall of the wooden planks'), is the location of a painting in tempera on plaster by Leonardo da Vinci, dating from about 1498. The decoration is of a room in the Castello Sforzesco in Milan. Its walls and vaulted ceiling are decorated with "intertwining plants with fruits and monochromes of roots and rocks" and a canopy created by sixteen trees.

Introduction and history 

In Milan, within the Sforza Castle, there is an important legacy by Leonardo da Vinci: “Sala delle Asse”, a room with walls and ceiling painted with a fascinating “trompe l’oeil”, depicting trunks, leaves, fruits, and knots, as if it was in the open air and not within a castle. Art historian Rocky Ruggiero describes the decoration of the square, fifteen-by-fifteen-meters room as creating the effect of a natural pergola as an architectural feature. Dr. Ruggiero suggests that da Vinci drew upon all of his scientific research into natural systems as he painted the masterful illusion that resembles a grove of mulberry trees.

The room was decorated in 1498, as testified by a letter to the Duke of Milan, Ludovico Sforza, nicknamed “il Moro” ("the moor”), that is dated April 21, 1498. In the letter Gualtiero Bascapè, the duke’s chancellor, states “…Magistro Leonardo promises to finish it by September”. On the 23rd, he wrote that “the large chamber is free from the boards”.

The current name of the room is incongruous. Some experts state that the name was used prior to the painting by Leonardo. The walls had been covered with wooden planks (in Italian, “asse” means planks), and hence, the hall of the planks had been the name traditionally used to identify the room. Other experts say that this name was a misreading of the letter; with his words, the chancellor was stating a fact (the getting rid of the planks), not giving the name of the room.

Immediately after this letter, in 1499, Milan was taken over by the French army led by king Louis XII. Over the centuries, several foreign dominations (Spanish, Austrians, and others) followed. The Sforza Castle was used for military purposes: the walls of the room were painted over in white and memory of the painting was lost.

When Italy was unified (1861) the castle was in full decay and people discussed tearing it down. Toward the end of the nineteenth century, architect Luca Beltrami implemented a plan for restoring the castle, as it can be seen today. Within the restoration, in 1893, some traces of the original paint were detected below the white surface covering the room. Beltrami found the proper financing (mostly from private sources) and selected Ernesto Rusca for a restoration of Sala delle Asse.

In 1902, visitors could see the result of this restoration: a wonderful depiction of trunks on the walls and a canopy of branches and leaves on the ceiling. Colors were bright. Immediately critics noted that the “style” did not resemble what they thought was Leonardo's "typical" style of painting. In addition, the lack of photographic documentation of the room's situation during the restoration raised suspicions.

In the 1950s, partially to appease the critics, a second restoration was conducted. Basically, colors were toned down and the room took a more “antique” flavor, which can be seen today.

In 2012, a new restoration started. The main goal was to block deterioration by humidity and other factors. The scientific goal was to investigate the decoration further, uncovering as much as possible of the original work by Leonardo.

This restoration was ongoing in December 2018 and some important results already had been achieved, including the rediscovery of beautiful black drawings (called “monochrome”) on the lower parts of the walls and as preliminary sketches.

The decoration of Sala Delle Asse 
Pietro Marani (member of the scientific committee for the current restoration) said about the room: “one is amazed by its spectacular vaulted ceiling, decorated with branches and knots all tangled together: a long rope, weaving together all these branches, is entwined with vegetal elements…”. According to another member of the scientific committee for the current restoration, Maria Teresa Fiorio, “a visitor feels a strong emotion in front of this magnificent example of painted wall decoration by da Vinci.”

What the visitor can see today is mainly due to the first restoration, coordinated by Architect Beltrami, at the beginning of the twentieth century. That restoration left the room fully decorated in the vault, with strong trunks on the lateral walls, interrupted by wooden panels. The bright colors used by the restorer, Ernesto Rusca, puzzled many leading experts of the time, who were used to the fading colors of the Last Supper. Traces of this restoration can still be seen in a few spots on the vault.

Visitors today see much more somber colors, the result of the second restoration performed by Ottemi della Rotta in the 1950s, when the bright colors of the first restoration that did not seem to fit what then was thought to be Leonardo da Vinci's style were muted. Experts of the scientific committee still have conflicting opinions about this subject. Wooden panels were still left on the lateral walls.

The greatest part of the decoration on the vault is represented by branches, leaves, and berries. The branches and the leaves create the illusion of one being in an open space, not in a room of the castle. Besides providing charming bright spots of color, the red berries probably are an allusion to the Duke of Milan, nicknamed “il Moro”, because in the local dialect both then and today, those mulberries are called “Moroni”.

Ropes and knots are interwoven with the branches. According to Francesca Tasso, vice president of the scientific committee, “ropes twisting into knots, some of which are extremely complex, constitute a recurring theme in Leonardo da Vinci’s work, during the two decades he spent in Milan”.

After the first restoration, the sturdy brown trunks were the departing point for the branches and wooden headboards, with seats for visitors, hid the lower parts of these trunks.

During the restoration in the 1950s, preparatory drawings for the original painting, executed in black over white paint were uncovered. That is a technique now known to be a characteristic of da Vinci. Beltrami had considered these drawings as additions made earlier and he covered them.

One of the merits of the current restoration is the uncovering of many of these drawings, called “monochrome” by the experts. Some of them show the roots of the trees penetrating the side walls and breaking them, with a decorative scheme reminiscent of the decoration of the Palazzo del Te, Mantua. Even more surprising, some other drawings suggest a different solution for the trunks. Cecilia Frosinini, from Opificio delle Pietre dure and member of the scientific committee, says that they suggest “the creation of thin, slanting trunks, springing from the roots and then joining the decoration on the ceiling”.

Current restoration 
A new restoration of Sala delle Asse was started in 2012 and was ongoing as of 2022.

The immediate goal was to stop the evident deterioration. In this case, several factors have been identified: humidity from the building, microclimatic changes due to negative interaction (chemical binding) between the substances used for the original painting and the materials used for the various restorations, and accumulation of filth (since artifacts such as this can't be cleaned regularly as in a domestic house).

The long-term goal is to provide a valid “aesthetic restoration”. First of all, painted surfaces must be cleaned and stabilized. Then the problem of “peeling off” layers due to previous restorations and integrating missing spots with new painting (using modern materials, such as watercolor, for example) must be faced. There are different opinions about several issues: should previous painting layers (due to restoration) be totally removed? How much new painting is allowed? Too little, will leave the room in an aesthetically unpleasant state, too much will be somehow a “false”. The scientific committee (see below) is debating the issues, guiding and supervising operations.

Cecilia Frosinini, from “Opificio delle pietre dure”, says "...modern restoration must be approached with great humility. It is necessary to appreciate both the original work of the author, and the work of the various restoration experts who followed.”

The restoration of the “monochrome” is a different story. It was not affected by previous restorations: it was not considered worthwhile and it was covered with wooden planks.

Activities  

Various activities have been performed since 2012,
 Archive digging: relevant documentation has been brought to light or put in the proper perspective. The material includes original letters (from the time of the original painting of the room), to historical documentation about the castle, and also about the two previous restorations.
 Architectural historical analysis: investigating all the historical events leading to the current situation of the room. Several alterations of the past openings in the room were detected and properly framed within the history of the castle.
 Technical diagnostics: several modern diagnostic techniques have been used.
 Thermography (detecting differences in temperature on the walls) was used to identify alteration in the building of the rooms (since different materials have different temperatures).
 Laser beams were used to build a precise 3-D model of the room.
 UV fluorescence was used to detect various layers of painting. Ultraviolet light, in fact, can be used to detect the different “organic binders” of paint, i.e. the organic substances (e.g. eggs) used to keep the colors stable. These binders were different from the time of Leonardo, to later periods, and to the previous restorations.

 Spectroscopy (in the Infra-Red range) has been used to detect the various “inorganic binders” used for painting, at various times.
 Artistic analysis: A careful analysis of various documents and results from diagnostics, has allowed better understanding of the various events and actions that have brought the castle (in general) and Sala delle Asse (specifically) to the current situation.
 Restoring drawings and paintings
 Careful “peeling off” of layers has allowed uncovering of older layers. This has been especially relevant for bringing to light the monochrome, currently considered the oldest layer of decoration in the room. It is likely that the drawings were created by Leonardo while preparing for the painting.

Scientific committee and restoration operations 
The restoration is being conducted by a team of leading experts under the supervision of a prestigious scientific committee:

Claudio A. M. Salsi, director of the Area Soprintendenza Castello, Musei Archeologici e Musei Storici (chairman)

Francesca Tasso, director of the Art Archives (vice president of the scientific committee)

Michela Palazzo, restorer at the Polo Museale della Lombardia (works supervisor of the restoration)

Giovanni Agosti, professor of modern art history at the Università degli Studi di Milano

Ermanno Arslan, academician at the Accademia dei Lincei and member of the board of directors of Italia Nostra Milano

Pinin Brambilla Barcilon, restorer

Marco Ciatti, superintendent of the Opificio delle Pietre Dure di Firenze

Luisa Cogliati Arano, member of the managing board of Ente Raccolta Vinciana of Milano

Giorgio Sebastiano Di Mauro, official of the Area Soprintendenza Castello, Musei Archeologici e Musei Storici

Alberto Felici, curator in the department for the restoration of mural paintings at Opificio delle Pietre Dure di Firenze

Maria Teresa Fiorio, vice president of Ente Raccolta Vinciana of Milan, professor of museum studies at the Università degli Studi di Milano

Cecilia Frosinini, art historian– director of the department of the restoration of mural paintings at Opificio delle Pietre Dure di Firenze

Larry Keith, director of conservation, National Gallery of London

Stefano L’Occaso, director of the Polo Museale della Lombardia

Pietro Marani, president of the Ente Raccolta Vinciana, professor of modern art history at the Politecnico di Milano

Marco Minoja, director of the Segretariato Regionale del Ministero dei beni e delle attività culturali e del turismo per la Lombardia

Antonio Paolucci, formerly director of the Vatican Museums

Alessandro Rovetta, professor of modern art history at the Università Cattolica del Sacro Cuore di Milano

Antonella Ranaldi, superintendent of archeologia, belle arti, e paesaggio per la città metropolitana di Milano

Luke Syson, curator in charge of the department of European sculpture and decorative arts at the Metropolitan Museum of Art of New York

Actors and stakeholders 
Various stakeholders have made possible the current restoration:

The city of Milan (under the action of the council member Filippo del Corno)

MIBACT (the Italian Ministry for Cultural Heritage)

ALES (a financing agency of the ministry)

A2A (main private sponsor of the restoration)

Politecnico di Milano (for scientific and technical support)

Following the restoration 
It is possible to follow the restoration, “day by day”, by connecting to the official website of the restoration.

References

External links

Official website about the restoration of Sala delle Asse

Paintings by Leonardo da Vinci
1490 paintings
Sforza Castle